The 1865 Wairarapa by-election was a by-election held  on 29 July in the  electorate in the Wairarapa during the 6th New Zealand Parliament.

The by-election was caused by the resignation of the incumbent, Charles Carter, who had returned to England.

He was replaced by Henry Bunny.

Results
The following table gives the election result:

References

Wairarapa 1865
1865 elections in New Zealand
July 1865 events
Politics of the Wellington Region
Wairarapa
1860s in Wellington